Halle Georges Carpentier is a multi-use indoor sporting arena that is located in the 13th arrondissement of Paris, France. The arena can be used for multiple sporting events, including: boxing, martial arts, badminton, table tennis, volleyball, handball, fencing, basketball, and gymnastics. It is part of a sports complex that also includes a gym and football, rugby, and athletics facilities. The arena is named after the French boxing legend Georges Carpentier, and it includes a statue of the boxer in the arena's lobby, by the sculptor Brennen.

The seating capacity of the arena when it is configured for basketball games is 5,009.

History
The arena opened in 1960, and was then renovated in 1988. It re-opened after the 1988 renovations on December 17, 1988. The French League basketball club JSF Nanterre has used the arena to host Euroleague games. The French handball club Paris Saint-Germain has also used the arena to host EHF Champions League games.

Events
Among the events that have taken place at the arena are:

French Badminton Open
Georges Marrane International Handball Challenge
Table Tennis World Cup
2010 World Fencing Championships
2010 Wheelchair Fencing World Championships
2015 World Jump Rope

References

External links

Halle Georges Carpentier 

Indoor arenas in France
Basketball venues in France
Sports venues completed in 1960
Sports venues in Paris